Dothan is a place-name from the Hebrew Bible, identified with Tel Dothan. It may refer to:

 Dothan, Alabama, a city in Dale, Henry, and Houston counties in the U.S. state of Alabama
 Dani Dothan, lyricist and vocalist for the Israeli rock and new wave band HaClique
 Trude Dothan (1922–2016), Israeli archaeologist
 Dothan, a model of the Pentium M family of mobile 32-bit single-core x86 microprocessors
 Tel Dothan, the archaeological site identified with biblical Dothan

See also
 Dotan (disambiguation)